Angelo Augustine "Angie" Brovelli (August 21, 1910 – August 5, 1995) was an American football running back who played for the Pittsburgh Pirates in the National Football League in 1933 and 1934.

References

1910 births
1995 deaths
People from Porterville, California
Players of American football from California
Sportspeople from Tulare County, California
American football running backs
Pittsburgh Pirates (football) players